18 Scorpii is a solitary star located at a distance of some  from the Sun at the northern edge of the Scorpius constellation. It has an apparent visual magnitude of 5.5, which is bright enough to be seen with the naked eye outside of urban areas. The star is drifting further away with a radial velocity of +11.6.

18 Scorpii has some physical properties in common with the Sun, a G-type star. Cayrel de Strobel (1996) included it in her review of the stars most similar to the Sun, and Porto de Mello & da Silva (1997) identified it as a younger solar twin. Some scientists therefore believe the prospects for life in its vicinity are good.

Characteristics 

18 Scorpii is a main sequence star of spectral and luminosity type G2 Va, with the luminosity class of 'V' indicating it is generating energy through the nuclear fusion of hydrogen in its core region. Sousa et al. (2008) found its metallicity to be about 1.1 times that of the Sun, which means the abundance of elements other than hydrogen or helium is 10% greater. The radius of this star, as measured using interferometry by Bazot et al. (2011), is 101% the radius of the Sun. When combined with the results of asteroseismology measurements, this allows the mass of the star to be estimated as 102% of the Sun's mass. This star is radiating 106% of the Sun's luminosity from its outer atmosphere at an effective temperature of 5,433 K. It is this heat that gives the star the yellow-hued glow of a G-type star.

According to Lockwood (2002), it has a temporal photometric behavior very similar to the Sun. Its brightness variation over its entire activity cycle is 0.09%, about the same as the Sun's brightness variations during recent solar cycles. Using the technique of Zeeman-Doppler imaging, Petit et al. (2008) have detected its surface magnetic field, showing that its intensity and geometry are very similar to the large-scale solar magnetic field. The estimated period for the activity cycle of 18 Scorpii is about seven years, which is significantly shorter than the Sun's, and its overall chromospheric activity level is noticeably higher.

Though 18 Scorpii is only slightly more metal-rich overall than the Sun, its lithium abundance is about three times as high; for this reason, Meléndez & Ramírez (2007) have suggested that 18 Scorpii be called a "quasi solar twin", reserving the term solar twin for stars (such as HIP 56948) that match the Sun, within the observational errors, for all parameters.

18 Scorpii is a young star at 2.9 Gyr (2.9 Billion years old). 18 Scorpii has not yet entered its stable burning stage. The Sun at 4.7 Gyr is at its most stable stage. Due to 18 Scorpii age, it is at the edge of range for a solar twin, and is more of a Solar analog. 18 Scorpii was thought to be 5.0 billion years old in the past, new measurements in 2013 found 18 Scorpii to be younger at 2.9 billion years old.

Search for planets 
18 Scorpii was identified in September 2003 by astrobiologist Margaret Turnbull from the University of Arizona in Tucson as one of the most promising nearby candidates for hosting life, based on her analysis of the HabCat list of stars. This is a solitary star, and does not display the level of excess infrared emission that would otherwise suggest the presence of unconsolidated circumstellar matter, such as a debris disk.

However, in 2023 evidence of a different candidate planet was found, which would be of super-Earth mass with a period of 19.9 days.

References

External links 

 NASA article on 18 Scorpii
18 Scorpii entry in the stellar database
Astronomers Measure Sun-Like Brightness Changes of the Solar Twin, 18 Scorpii

G-type main-sequence stars
Scorpii, 18
Scorpii, 18
Scorpius (constellation)
BD-07 4242
Scorpii, 18
0616
146233
079672
6060